Johannes Radke (7 August 1853 – 1938) was a German architect, building official and councilor in Düsseldorf.

Life 

Born in Margonin, Radke, son of the Lutheran preacher Johann Friedrich Daniel Lebrecht Radke (1841-1874), completed his schooling in 1874 at the Royal Grammar School in Bydgoszcz with the desire to study construction. After his studies, he worked in Berlin in the building administration of the Kaiserliche Reichspost as "Kaiserlicher Postbauinspektor" (Imperial Postal Building Inspector), before being appointed city building inspector in Düsseldorf in 1900. Between 1901 and 1921, he was also municipal alderman there.

He designed numerous public buildings for Düsseldorf. Radke had already gained international attention before his time in Düsseldorf through the construction of the German exhibition pavilions for the World Exposition in Chicago in 1893 (World's Columbian Exposition) and the Paris Exposition Universelle.

Work

Realizations 
 1893: German exhibition pavilion at the World's Columbian Exposition
 1900: German exhibition pavilion at the  Exposition Universelle (1900)   
 1900: Rheinuferpromenade in Düsseldorf-Altstadt
 among others 1902: Düsselschlösschen, Weinlokal at Burgplatz
 1904–1906: verschiedene Bauten des University Hospital of Düsseldorf
 among others 1906: Holy Spirit Chapel (Church of the Düsseldorf University Hospital).
 1904–1906: Görres-Gymnasium in Düsseldorf-Stadtmitte.
 1904–1906: Leibniz-Gymnasium in Düsseldorf-Pempelfort
 1904–1907: Luisen-Gymnasium in Düsseldorf-Stadtmitte.
 1905: Friedhofskapelle auf dem Südfriedhof in Düsseldorf-Bilk.
 1905–1906: Leo Statz Berufskolleg in Düsseldorf-Unterbilk.
 1905–1907: Primary school at Badeanstalt Lindenstraße 128–130.
 1907: Realschule Luisenstraße in Düsseldorf-Friedrichstadt.
 1907–1911: Hauptfeuerwehrdepot (Feuerwache III) in Düsseldorf-Pempelfort
 1908–1910: Villa Wendelstadt in Bad Godesberg (Bauausführung durch Theo Westbrook)
 1910–1912: Schule am Comeniusplatz (Comenius-Gymnasium, Comeniusstraße 1), Düsseldorf-Oberkassel.
 1911–1912: Lessing-Gymnasium in Düsseldorf-Oberbilk.
 1913–1914: Hauptschule Bernburger Straße in Düsseldorf-Eller.
 1927–1928: eigenes Wohnhaus (als Ruhesitz), called 'Haus zur Linde', Bondorfer Straße in Bad Honnef

Publications 
 Beschreibung des Schulgebäudes. Bagel, Düsseldorf 1904.

References

Further reading 
 Karl H. Neidhöfer: Düsseldorf. Straßennamen und ihre Geschichte. Droste Verlag, Düsseldorf 1979, .
 Paul Sigel: Exponiert. Deutsche Pavillons auf Weltausstellungen. Verlag für Bauwesen, Berlin 2002, .

German architects
1853 births
1938 deaths
People from Margonin